XOP may refer to:

XML-binary Optimized Packaging, a W3C recommendation for embedding binary data in XML
External Operations in IGOR Pro, used to add data acquisition, manipulation and analysis features
X-ray Oriented Programs, a widget-based driver software that is used as front-end interface optical simulations
XOP instruction set, a computer instruction set introduced by AMD in 2009
A touhou-like game, but without the Japanese.